Acme Truck Line, Inc. is a national transportation service based in Gretna, Louisiana on the West Bank of New Orleans. The company was founded in 1960 and now sends thousands of trucks making deliveries nationwide. According to the 2008 New Orleans Comprehensive Annual Financial Report, the business was number 3 among top employers in the city.

Overview

The ACME company boasts a fleet of more than 2,900 trucks with a transport network extending to seven states operating 24 hours/day, 365 days a year. Diversification of equipment and locations has made the trucking company very efficient in handling the proper inventory of equipment and the minutest of customer needs. ACME's general merchandise each week include about 9,000 loads of oilfield and common commodities delivered on time as scheduled. Personalised service and prompt response is what the ACME pursues.

References

External links

 Acme Truck Line

Trucking companies of the United States
Transportation companies based in Louisiana